Battle of Przemyśl may refer to:

 Battle of Przemyśl (1918)
 Battle of Przemyśl (1939)

See also 
 Siege of Przemyśl, during World War I